Cycling competitions at the Beijing 2008 Summer Olympics were held from August 9 to August 23 at the Laoshan Velodrome (track events), Laoshan Mountain Bike Course, Laoshan BMX Field and the Beijing Cycling Road Course.

The event was dominated by the Great Britain team, who claimed 14 medals in total, including eight golds, seven of them from the ten events in the velodrome. This marked the beginning of a period of complete domination for Great Britain that would last to the 2020 Summer Olympics; The British team would claim 21 of the 30 gold medals awarded in the velodrome over the next three Games, 70% of all gold medals on offer.

Events
Eighteen sets of medals were awarded in four disciplines: track cycling, road cycling, mountain bike, and, new for 2008, BMX.  The following events were contested:

Track cycling

Team sprint men
Sprint men
Keirin men
4000 m Team pursuit men
4000 m Individual pursuit men
Madison 50 km men
Points race 40 km men
Sprint women
3000 m Individual pursuit women
Points race 25 km women

Road cycling
Road bicycle race men—239 km
Road time trial men—46.8 km
Road bicycle race women—120 km
Road time trial women—31.2 km

Mountain bike
Mountain bike men
Mountain bike women

BMX
BMX race men
BMX race women

Medal table

Road cycling

Track cycling

Men

Women

* Participate in the preliminary round only.

Mountain biking

BMX

Broken records

Qualification

See also 
Cycling at the 2008 Summer Paralympics

References

External links 

Beijing 2008
Union Cycliste Internationale
Cycling BMX – Official Results Book
Cycling Mountain Bike – Official Results Book
Cycling Road – Official Results Book
Cycling Track – Official Results Book

 
2008 Summer Olympics events
2008
Olympics
International cycle races hosted by China